The 1896–97 Penn Quakers men's basketball team represented University of Pennsylvania during the 1896–97 collegiate men's basketball season. The Quakers finished the season with an overall record of 2–4.

References

Penn Quakers men's basketball seasons
Penn
Philly Pennsylvania
Philly Pennsylvania